Arawakia inopinata is a species of beetle in the family Cerambycidae, the only species in the genus Arawakia.

References

Tillomorphini
Monotypic Cerambycidae genera